The 1979–80 North Dakota Fighting Sioux men's ice hockey team represented the University of North Dakota in college ice hockey. In its 2nd year under head coach John Gasparini the team compiled a 31–8–1 record and reached the NCAA tournament for the eighth time. The Fighting Sioux defeated Northern Michigan 5–2 to win the championship game at the Providence Civic Center in Providence, Rhode Island.

Season

Early season
After finishing as the national runner-up in John Gasparini's first year as head coach, North Dakota was hoping to continue their renaissance after a decade of futility. The Fighting Sioux began their season with a four-game home stand and did not look particularly strong, splitting both weekends against Colorado College and Michigan Tech. After taking both road games against a bad Denver team, UND hosted St. Lawrence and won both games to push their record to 6–2.

After splitting a road series against Michigan State, North Dakota hosted Minnesota in a rematch of last year's championship game, winning both games and surging to the top of the WCHA. UND sandwiched an exhibition game against the eventual gold-medalist US National Team between their series against the Golden Gophers and the Bulldogs, though in the later set the Fighting Sioux could only manage a split.

Over the winter break North Dakota played two non-conference series. Up first Ohio State at home where UND dominated the two games. A couple of weeks later the Fighting Sioux found themselves in Marquette to take on Northern Michigan. While North Dakota was distinguishing itself as the class of the WCHA, NMU possessed an even more impressive record at 14–2 and continued to prove they were no fluke by downing North Dakota in both games.

Second half
The two losses didn't harm UND that much as they didn't affect the team's top seed in the WCHA. However, just for good measure, the Fighting Sioux swept the next two weekends (both at home) against conference opponents to take a stranglehold of the conference. UND's lead was so large by this point that when they could only earn one win in the next four games it hardly mattered to their conference standing.

After the poor road trip UND played their third national team of the season, finally managing to take town an Olympic squad, albeit the one that would finish dead-last at the 1980 winter games. After the win North Dakota went on a winning streak, beginning at home where they hadn't lost since early November. UND won their final 8 regular season games, including 4 on the road (which had given them trouble all season) to finish with a stellar 25–8–1 record and easily win the WCHA.

WCHA tournament
With the top seed, North Dakota played host to Michigan State and avenged their early-season loss with a comfortable 8–1 win in the first game. With a 7-goal lead to work with the Fighting Sioux were able to relax in game 2 and win the series 13–4. The second series against Notre Dame was more of the same with UND taking a huge lead after a 10–4 win, eventually capturing the series 17–8. North Dakota won their second consecutive WCHA title and fourth overall and received the top western seed for the NCAA tournament.

NCAA tournament
UND opened against ECAC Hockey runner-up Dartmouth for the second time in as many years and had a nearly identical performance. After the 4–1 victory UND met the #1 team in the country, Northern Michigan. The teams had two of the top offenses in the nation (only Minnesota scored more goals) and game would see the top four NCAA scorers on the ice at the same time. despite being a freshman Darren Jensen had distinguished himself as the best option in goal for North Dakota and, having learned from his error the previous year, Gasparini started the Creston in goal. Doug Smail would open the scoring just before the mid-point of the first period but shortly thereafter leading scorer and team captain Mark Taylor would be knocked out of the game with an injury. Smail, the leading goal scorer, would take over and score twice more to produce only the second natural hat-trick in championship history. Phil Sykes would in on the scoring in the third period, his fourth point of the night. After the goal the Wildcat offence finally woke up and scored, scoring twice in a span of 51 seconds, but three minutes the game was put away when Smail tied the NCAA record with his fourth goal of the contest, again with a primary assist from Sykes. North Dakota won the championship having outshot NMU 45–22, ending their 16-year championship drought.

Awards and honors
Doug Smail won the tournament MOP for his nearly single-handed victory in the championship game and was joined on the All-Tournament team by Phil Sykes and Marc Chorney. Mark Taylor finished 4 points back of the scoring title but was named to the AHCA All-American West Team along with Howard Walker. Both Walker and Taylor made the All-WCHA First Team while Smail and Chorney were named to the Second Team.

Darren Jensen would win his first start the following season, extending his undefeated streak to 15 games to start a career; still an NCAA record (as of 2016).

Three players were selected in the 1980 NHL Entry Draft with all three reaching the NHL.

Standings

Schedule

|-
!colspan=12 style=";" | Exhibition

|-
!colspan=12 style=";" | Regular Season

|-
!colspan=12 style=";" | 

|- align="center" bgcolor="#e0e0e0"
|colspan=12|North Dakota Wins Series 13-4

|- align="center" bgcolor="#e0e0e0"
|colspan=12|North Dakota Wins Series 17-8
|-
!colspan=12 style=";" |

Roster and scoring statistics

Goaltending statistics

1980 championship game

(W1) North Dakota vs. (A) Northern Michigan

Players drafted into the NHL

1980 NHL Entry Draft

† incoming freshman

See also
1980 NCAA Division I Men's Ice Hockey Tournament
List of NCAA Division I Men's Ice Hockey Tournament champions

References

North Dakota Fighting Hawks men's ice hockey seasons
North Dakota
North Dakota
North Dakota
North Dakota
North Dakota
North Dakota